Nuclear collision length is the mean free path of a particle before undergoing a nuclear reaction, for a given particle in a given medium. The collision length is smaller than the nuclear interaction length because the latter excludes the elastic and quasi-elastic (diffractive) reactions from its definition.

See also
Nuclear interaction length
Radiation length

External links
http://ikpe1101.ikp.kfa-juelich.de/briefbook_part_detectors/node30.html

Experimental particle physics